Duncan is a Scottish and Irish surname. For the etymology of the surname Duncan this web page cites: Dictionary of American Family Names. Another opinion is that the Gaelic Donnchadh is composed of the elements donn, meaning "brown"; and chadh, meaning "chief" or "noble". In some cases when the surname originates in County Sligo, Ireland, it is an Anglicized form of the Irish Gaelic name MacDonough or Mac Donnchadha and Ó Duinnchinn, meaning "descendant of Donncheann". The Gaelic Donncheann is a byname composed of the elements donn, meaning "brown-haired man" or "chieftain"; and ceann, meaning "head". The surname Duncan is represented in Scottish Gaelic as MacDhonnchaidh. The surname also originated from the given name Duncan.

Acting
Carmen Duncan (1942–2019), Australian actress
Lindsay Duncan (born 1950), British actress
Michael Clarke Duncan (1957–2012), American actor
Sandy Duncan (born 1946), American actress

Art and design 

 Charles Stafford Duncan (1892–1952), San Francisco painter and lithographer.
 Edward Duncan (1803–1882), British watercolourist 
 Jane Duncan (architect) (born 1953), British architect
 Jean Duncan (artist) (1933–2018), British artist
Walter Duncan (1848–1932), British painter

Military, armed forces 
Adam Duncan (1731–1804), British admiral
Donald B. Duncan (1896–1975), American vice-admiral
Donald W. Duncan (1930–2009), American soldier and anti-war activist
Henry Duncan (1735–1814), British naval officer
Pippa Duncan, British naval officer
W. G. G. Duncan Smith (1914–1996), British military aviator
Anthony H. Duncan, American Army Military Police Honor Guard Specialist

Music
C Duncan, born Christopher Duncan, Scottish composer and musician whose debut album Architect was nominated for the 2015 Mercury Prize
Gary Duncan (1946–2019), American guitarist and singer
Johnny Duncan (country singer) (1938–2006), American singer
Lesley Duncan, English singer and songwriter
Little Arthur Duncan (1934–2008), American blues harmonica player, singer, and songwriter
Molly Duncan (1945–2019), Scottish tenor saxophonist
Tim Duncan (singer), Southern Gospel singer
Trevor Duncan, English composer
Zélia Duncan, Brazilian singer and songwriter

Politics
Alan Duncan (born 1957), British politician
Arne Duncan (born 1964), U.S. Secretary of Education (2009–2015)
Charles Duncan Jr. (1926–2022), U.S. Secretary of Energy (1979–1981)
Jimmy Duncan, (born 1947), American politician, U.S. Representative from Tennessee's 2nd congressional district (1988–2019)
John Duncan Sr., (1919–1988), American politician, U.S. Representative from Tennessee's 2nd congressional district (1965–1988), father of Jimmy Duncan
Kirsty Duncan (born 1966), Canadian politician and Deputy Leader of the Government in the House of Commons
Leslie Duncan (1880–1952), newspaper editor and politician in South Australia
Mike Duncan (born 1951), chairman of the Board of Governors of the United States Postal Service and former chairman of the Republican National Committee in the United States
Peter Duncan (Australian politician) (born 1945), Labor representative in South Australian and federal parliaments
Peter Duncan (British politician) (born 1965), Scottish politician, Member of Parliament from Galloway and Upper Nithsdale (2001–2005)
Sir Walter Gordon Duncan (1885–1963), South Australian pastoralist and MLC
Walter Hughes Duncan (1848–1906), South Australian pastoralist and MHA for Burra
Walter Leslie Duncan (1883–1947), Australian Senator for New South Wales
Wesley Duncan (b. 1980), American politician, Member of the Nevada Assembly
William Addison Duncan (1836–1884), U.S. Representative from Pennsylvania's 19th congressional district (1883–1984)

Sports
Alex Duncan (1900–1984), former Australian rules footballer with Carlton (1921–1924, 1926–1930)
Andy Duncan (basketball) (1922–2006), American basketball player
Bobby Duncan (born 1945), Scottish footballer
Bobby Duncan (footballer, born 2001)
Cecil Duncan (1893–1979), Canadian ice hockey administrator
Chris Duncan (1981-2019), American baseball player
Dave Duncan (baseball) (born 1945), Major League Baseball player and pitching coach, father of Chris Duncan and Shelley Duncan
Darryl Duncan, Australian rugby league footballer
Eric Duncan (born 1984), American baseball coach
George Duncan (golfer)  (1883–1964), Scottish golfer
Ian Duncan (born 1961), Kenyan rally driver
Jaelyn Duncan (born 2000), American football player
Jean Duncan (umpire), Scottish hockey umpire
Jeff Duncan (baseball) (born 1978), American baseball player and coach
John Duncan (footballer) (born 1949), Scottish footballer who notably played for Dundee and Tottenham Hotspur
Johnny Duncan (footballer) (1896–1966), Scottish international footballer and manager, who was most notably with Leicester City
Jon Duncan (born 1975), British orienteer
Jonathan Duncan (swimmer) (born 1982), New Zealand swimmer
Katie Duncan (born 1988), New Zealand association footballer
Ken Duncan (American football) (born 1946), American football player
Mariano Duncan (born 1963), Dominican baseball player
Rick Duncan (born 1941), American football player
Ross Duncan (born 1944), Australian cricketer
Sam Duncan, Westmeath Gaelic footballer
Scott Duncan (footballer) (1888–1976), former Scottish football player and manager
Shelley Duncan, American baseball player
Tim Duncan (born 1976), American basketball player
Vern Duncan (1890–1954), American baseball player

Writers
 Alasdair Duncan, Australian writer
 Dave Duncan (writer) (1933–2018), Canadian writer
 Glen Duncan (born 1965), British author
 Jane Duncan (1910–1976), pseudonym of Scottish writer Elizabeth Jane Cameron
 Lois Duncan (1934–2016), American writer of children's books
Mary Lundie Duncan (1814–1840), Scottish poet and hymn-writer
Robert Duncan (poet), U.S. beat poet

Other fields
 Bruce Duncan (born 1938), British priest and founder
 Carl Porter Duncan (1921–1999), professor of experimental psychology at Northwestern University, US
 Dan Duncan (1933–2010), American businessman
 David Duncan, government witness in the Enron scandal
 David Douglas Duncan (1916–2018), American photojournalist
 David F. Duncan, epidemiologist and drug policy adviser to former US president Bill Clinton
 Donald F. Duncan Sr., American entrepreneur and inventor, most commonly associated with Yo-yos
 Gary Duncan, defendant in case Duncan v. Louisiana decided by the US Supreme Court
 George Smith Duncan, a tramway and mining engineer
 Graham Duncan (botanist), botanist at Kirstenbosch Botanic Garden, South Africa
 Helen Duncan (1897–1956), Scottish medium
 Henry Duncan (minister), founder of the first Trustee Savings Bank
 Iain Duncan Smith, British politician
 Isadora Duncan, American dancer
 Jonathan Duncan (currency reformer) (1799–1865), British advocate of reforming the monetary system
 Jonathan Duncan (Governor of Bombay) (1756–1811)
 Joseph Edward Duncan (1963–2021), American convicted serial killer and child molester
 Kath Duncan (1888 or 1889 – 1954), Scottish communist activist
 Ken Duncan (photographer) (born 1954), Australian photographer
 Leslie Duncan (1880–1952), newspaper editor and politician in South Australia
 Mary Ellen Duncan (died 2022), American academic administrator and teacher
 Mike Duncan (podcaster), U.S. history podcaster and writer
 Pearl Duncan, Australian retired teacher, anthropologist, academic and Aboriginal elder.
 Scott Duncan (businessman), American billionaire
 Stephen Duncan (1787–1867), American plantation owner in the Antebellum South
 Stewart Duncan (philosopher), American philosopher
 Thomas Eric Duncan (1972–2014), first Ebola victim of the 2014 West African outbreak to develop symptoms while in the US
 Vender Duncan (1928–1959), American serial killer
 Walter Jack Duncan (1881–1941), war artist for the US Army during World War I
 Warren W. Duncan (1857–1938), American jurist
 William Duncan (American physician) (1860–1900), American physician and politician
 William Duncan (philosopher) (17171760), Scottish natural philosopher and classicist

Fictional characters
Karen Beecher-Duncan, supporting character (and sometime member) of the Teen Titans (DC Comics)
Lily Duncan, a fictional character from Mona the Vampire
Mal Duncan, supporting character (and sometime member) of the Teen Titans (DC Comics)
Tammy & Tommy Duncan, supporting characters from The Mighty Ducks.
Tyler Duncan and Mrs. Duncan are secondary characters in Big Time Rush
Veronica Duncan, supporting character in Young Sheldon
Ian Duncan, a character in the TV series Community, played by actor John Oliver
King Duncan, of Shakespeare's Macbeth
Duncan, (Walter Sparrow) Robin of Locksley's companion in the 1991 film Robinhood Prince of Thieves.
Duncan Idaho, a Mentat from Frank Herbert's Dune
Tara Duncan, the titular character of the French fourteenth-book series by Sophie Audouin-Mamikonian. Unfortunately, only the first two have been translated into English.

See also
 Andrew Duncan (disambiguation)
 Andy Duncan (disambiguation)
 Clan Duncan
 Duncan (given name)
 John Duncan (disambiguation)
 Raymond Duncan (disambiguation)

References

English-language surnames
Scottish surnames
Scottish Gaelic-language surnames